The Kurdistan Premier League is the foremost association football league in the Kurdistan Region of Iraq. It is overseen by the Iraqi Kurdistan Football Association. The league is not officially recognized by FIFA or any of its confederations, therefore cannot compete in their continental or intercontinental competitions. The season runs from August and finishes in May, with each playing twenty six matches each. During the season, clubs compete for the Kurdistan Cup, which follows with the Kurdistan Super Cup, a contest held between league winners and the cup winners.

The current champions are  New Sirwan SC, who have just won their first league title.

History 
The first season was the 2006/07 season, which saw Duhok Football Club crowned as the first champions.

Only nine clubs participated in the 2017/18 Kurdistan Premier League season, which did not start until February 2018 after five teams pulled out. Kurd striker Dyar Ali broke the record for highest goals scored, with 17 goals in one season, previously held by Brazilian striker Thiago Amaral with 12 goals in one season. The club with the highest cups is Zeravani SC with 4 cups, followed by Erbil SC with 3.

Current members 

 Peshmerge Hawler SC 
 Brayati FC 
 Handren SC
 Saidsadq SC
 Chamchamal FC
 Zakho FC
 Soran SC 
 Sherwana SC
 New Sirwan SC
 Duhok SC
 Ararat SC
 Darbandikhan FC
 Akrè FC
 Chwarqwrna FC
 Shaqlawa FC

Champions

References 

Iraqi Kurdistan
Football in Iraq
Football in Kurdistan